Mohanlal Chaturbhuj Kumhar is an artisan of Rajasthan. He won the Shilp Guru award in 2003 for his skills in terracotta sculpture. Born in 1939 he is resident of Nathdwara. In 23rd Surajkund Crafts Mela. Mohan Lal Chaturbhuj of Rajasthan was also awarded the Kalamani for his works in terracotta. He has participated in promoting this traditional art in various countries like Spain, USA and Australia. The Government of India awarded him the civilian honour of Padma Shri in 2012.

Awards
Master Craftman National Award 1988, 
State Award 1984, Shilp Guru Award 2003, 
Maharana shajansingh Award 2001, 
Raj Ratan Award1997, 
Kala shree Award1991, [foreign Work shop];

References

External links 

Indian artisans
Rajasthani people
People from Rajsamand district
Living people
1939 births
Recipients of the Padma Shri in arts
Terracotta